Hawkeye (also referred to as Hawkeye: The First Frontier) is a television series, airing in syndication for one season during 1994–1995, and produced by Stephen J. Cannell.  The series was filmed in North Vancouver and Vancouver, British Columbia, Canada.

Based on characters from the Leatherstocking Tales, a set of novels written by James Fenimore Cooper, the series takes place in 1755 Hudson Valley, New York during the French and Indian War. It follows the main character, Natty Bumppo (Lee Horsley), his Native American companion Chingachgook (Rodney A. Grant), English trading post owner Elizabeth Shields (Lynda Carter) and other people stationed at or living in the vicinity of Fort Bennington.

Cast
Lee Horsley as Hawkeye (Natty Bumppo)
Lynda Carter as Elizabeth Shields
Duncan Fraser as Colonel Munro
Dave "Squatch" Ward as Sam
Rodney A. Grant as Chingachgook
Garwin Sanford as Captain Taylor Shields
Lochlyn Munro as McKinney
Jed Rees as Peevey

Episodes
In the 18th century during the war between French and British troops, the man of the woods Hawkeye helps Elizabeth Shields, an Englishwoman, to deliver her husband from the French. The action takes place in the Hudson Valley.

Home media
On March 22, 2011, Mill Creek Entertainment released Hawkeye: The Complete Series on DVD in Region 1.

In June 2022, Visual Entertainment re-released Hawkeye - The Complete Series on DVD in Region 1.

References

External links

 Hawkeye page on Cannell.com
 http://www.wonderland-site.com/html/hawk.htm

Television series by Stephen J. Cannell Productions
1994 American television series debuts
1995 American television series endings
Fiction set in 1755
First-run syndicated television programs in the United States
Television shows filmed in Vancouver
Television shows set in New York (state)
1990s Western (genre) television series